Sucha Dolna  is a village in the administrative district of Gmina Wartkowice, within Poddębice County, Łódź Voivodeship, in central Poland.

Massacre during Second World War

During the German Invasion of Poland in 1939, German forces on 11 September murdered 11 villagers. The victims were beaten to death with blunt weapons. The victims include two children.

References

Villages in Poddębice County
Massacres in Poland
World War II sites in Poland 
World War II sites of Nazi Germany 
Germany–Poland relations
Nazi war crimes in Poland